This is a list of Hamilton Academical F.C. seasons in Scottish football, from their foundation in 1874 onwards. It details the club's achievements in senior league and cup competitions and the top scorers for each season. The list of top scorers also chronicles how the club's scoring records have progressed throughout the club's history.

Summary

Hamilton Academical were formed in late 1874 by the rector and pupils of Hamilton Academy. The club soon became members of the Scottish Football Association and initially began competing in the Scottish Cup and Qualifying Cup, before joining the Scottish Football League in November 1897 following the resignation of Renton.

They have twice been runners up in the Scottish Cup, in 1910–11 (losing to Celtic after a replay) and in 1934–35 (losing to Rangers). The 1920s and 30s was the most successful period in the history of the Accies, when they achieved a highest finish of 4th in the top tier of Scottish football (also in 1935) and reached the semi-final of the Scottish Cup on three further occasions in 1925, 1930 and 1932.

They maintained their place in the highest division for 33 consecutive seasons from 1906 until the interruption of World War II in 1939; in the first season after the end of conflict, 1946–47, the club was unable to field a competitive side and finished bottom of the table with only 11 points, bringing the long run to an end.

Seasons

Notes

League performance summary 
The Scottish Football League was founded in 1890 and, other than during seven years of hiatus during World War II, the national top division has been played every season since. The following is a summary of Hamilton's divisional status:

123 total eligible seasons (including 2019–20)
47 seasons in top level
63 seasons in second level
5 seasons in third level
1 seasons in fourth level
7 seasons not involved – before club was league member

References

Sources
Soccerbase
FitbaStats

External links
 Video clip of the 1935 Scottish Cup final by Pathé News
Hamilton Academical at Football Club History Database
Club History at Hamilton Academical Memory Bank

Seasons
 
Hamilton Academical
Seasons